Events from the year 1986 in the United States.

Incumbents

Federal government
 President: Ronald Reagan (R-California)
 Vice President: George H. W. Bush (R-Texas)
 Chief Justice: Warren E. Burger (Minnesota) (until September 26), William Rehnquist (Wisconsin) (starting September 26)
 Speaker of the House of Representatives: Tip O'Neill (D-Massachusetts)
 Senate Majority Leader: Bob Dole (R-Kansas)
 Congress: 99th

Events

January

 January 12 – STS-61-C: Space Shuttle Columbia is launched with the first Hispanic-American astronaut, Dr. Franklin Chang Díaz.
 January 20 – The first federal Martin Luther King Jr. Day, honoring Martin Luther King Jr., is observed.
January 23 – The first group of artists are inducted to the Rock and Roll Hall of Fame, which included Elvis Presley, James Brown, Little Richard, Fats Domino, Ray Charles, Chuck Berry, Sam Cooke, the Everly Brothers, Buddy Holly, and Jerry Lee Lewis.
 January 24 – The Voyager 2 space probe makes its first encounter with Uranus.
 January 26 – Super Bowl XX: The Chicago Bears defeat the New England Patriots 46–10 at the Louisiana Superdome in New Orleans, Louisiana.
 January 28
 STS-51-L: Space Shuttle Challenger disintegrates 73 seconds after launch, killing the crew of seven astronauts, including schoolteacher Christa McAuliffe (see Space Shuttle Challenger disaster).
 President Ronald Reagan postpones for one week the State of the Union address that had been scheduled for the evening and instead addresses the nation on the Challenger disaster.
 January 31 – Two earthquakes (5.0  and 4.4 ) affected northeastern Ohio causing minor damage and 17 injuries. The shocks in this doublet earthquake occurred almost six hours apart with both having a maximum Mercalli intensity of VI (Strong).

February
 February 4 – President Reagan delivers his fifth State of the Union Address.
 February 19 – After waiting 37 years, the United States Senate approves a treaty outlawing genocide.
 February 25 – People Power Revolution: President Ferdinand Marcos of the Philippines goes into exile in Hawaii after 20 years of rule; Corazon Aquino becomes the first Filipino woman president, first as an interim president. Salvador Laurel becomes her Vice President.
 February 27 – The United States Senate allows its debates to be televised on a trial basis.

March
Halley's Comet reaches the closest point to the Earth during its second visit to the solar system in the 20th century. The next time it will be seen is predicted for 2061. 
March 9 – United States Navy divers find the largely intact but heavily damaged crew compartment of the Space Shuttle Challenger; the bodies of all seven astronauts are still inside.
 March 24 – The 58th Academy Awards, hosted by Alan Alda, Jane Fonda and Robin Williams, are held at Dorothy Chandler Pavilion in Los Angeles, with Sydney Pollack's Out of Africa winning Best Picture, Best Director and five other awards out of 11 nominations. The film is tied in nominations by Steven Spielberg's The Color Purple.
 March 26 – An article in The New York Times charges that Kurt Waldheim, former United Nations Secretary General and candidate for president of Austria, may have been involved in Nazi war crimes during World War II.

April
 April 5 – 1986 West Berlin discotheque bombing: The West Berlin discothèque, a known hangout for United States soldiers, is bombed, killing three and injuring 230; Libya is held responsible.
 April 15 – Operation El Dorado Canyon: At least 15 people die after United States planes bomb targets in the Libyan capital, Tripoli, and the Benghazi region.
 April 17 – British journalist John McCarthy is kidnapped in Beirut (released in August 1991) and three others are found dead; Revolutionary Cells (RZ) claims responsibility in retaliation for the U.S. bombing of Libya.
 April 29
 Roger Clemens sets the record for the most strikeouts in a 9-inning Major League Baseball game, striking out 20 batters.
 A major fire at Los Angeles Public Library caused by arson destroys 400,000 volumes.

May

 May 16 – Top Gun, an action film featuring naval aviation and starring Tom Cruise, Anthony Edwards, Val Kilmer and Kelly McGillis, debuts in cinemas. It goes on to become the highest-grossing film of the year, netting nearly $177 million in America alone.
 May 25 – Hands Across America: approximately 6.5 million people form a human chain from New York City to Long Beach, California, to raise money to fight hunger and homelessness.

June
 June 4 – Jonathan Pollard pleads guilty to espionage for selling top secret United States military intelligence to Israel.
 June 5–11 – Excedrin cyanide tampering crisis (see Stella Nickell).
 June 8 – The Boston Celtics defeat the Houston Rockets in six games to win the NBA Championship.
 June 9 – The Rogers Commission Report is released on the Space Shuttle Challenger disaster.
 June 19 – American college basketball player Len Bias suffers a fatal cardiac arrhythmia from a cocaine overdose less than 48 hours after being selected 2nd overall by the Boston Celtics in the 1986 NBA Draft.

July
 July 5 – The Statue of Liberty is reopened to the public after an extensive refurbishing.
 July 8 – The 6.0  North Palm Springs earthquake shook Southern California with a maximum Mercalli intensity of VII (Very strong), causing 29–40 injuries and $4.5–6 million in losses.
 July 13 – The 5.8  Oceanside earthquake shook the south coast of California with a maximum Mercalli intensity of VI (Strong), causing $700,000 in losses and one death.
 July 21 – The 6.2  Chalfant Valley earthquake shook eastern California with a maximum Mercalli intensity of VI (Strong), causing $2.7 million in losses and two injuries.

August
 August 6 – In Louisville, Kentucky, William J. Schroeder, the second artificial heart recipient, dies after 620 days.
 August 20 – In Edmond, Oklahoma, United States Postal Service employee Patrick Sherrill guns down 14 of his co-workers before committing suicide.
 August 31
 Aeroméxico Flight 498, a Douglas DC-9, collides with a Piper PA-28 over Cerritos, California, killing 67 on both aircraft and 15 on the ground.
 The cargo ship Khian Sea departs from the docks of Philadelphia, Pennsylvania, carrying 14,000 tons of toxic waste. It wanders the seas for the next 16 months trying to find a place to dump its cargo.

September
 September 5 – Pan Am Flight 73, a flight from Bombay, India, to John F. Kennedy Airport in New York, is hijacked. Twenty-one people are killed during the hijacking, including nationals from India, the United States, Pakistan, and Mexico.

October
 October 1 – U.S. President Ronald Reagan signs the Goldwater–Nichols Act into law, making official the largest reorganization of the United States Department of Defense since the Air Force was made a separate branch of service in 1947.
 October 9
 United States District Court Judge Harry E. Claiborne becomes the fifth federal official to be removed from office through impeachment.
 The Fox Broadcasting Company (then abbreviated as FBC; now Fox) launches as the United States' fourth commercial broadcast television network, the first such attempt since 1967.
 October 11 – Cold War: Ronald Reagan and Soviet leader Mikhail Gorbachev meet in Reykjavík, Iceland, to continue discussions about scaling back their intermediate missile arsenals in Europe (the talks break down in failure).
 October 22 – In New York City, WNBC Radio's traffic helicopter crashes into the Hudson River, killing traffic reporter Jane Dornacker. The last words heard on-the-air were Dornacker's screams of terror, "Hit the water! Hit the water! Hit the water!"
 October 27 
 World Series: The New York Mets defeat the Boston Red Sox in 7 games. This is the second world series title in the Mets franchise. It is also remembered for Game 6, when Bill Buckner lets an easy ground ball hit by Mookie Wilson roll through his legs, letting the Mets win and pull even with the Red Sox in the series.
 Great Basin National Park is established.
 October 28 – The centennial of the Statue of Liberty's dedication is celebrated in New York Harbor.

November
 November 3 – Iran–Contra affair: The Lebanese magazine Ash-Shiraa reports that the United States has been selling weapons to Iran in secret, in order to secure the release of seven American hostages held by pro-Iranian groups in Lebanon.
 November 4 
 Democrats regain control of the United States Senate for the first time in six years. In California, Chief Justice Rose Bird and two colleagues are removed by voters from the Supreme Court of California for opposing capital punishment.
 The Commonwealth of the Northern Mariana Islands officially becomes a territory of the United States.
 November 21 – Iran-Contra Affair: National Security Council member Oliver North and his secretary, Fawn Hall, start shredding documents implicating them in selling weapons to Iran and channeling the proceeds to help fund the Contra rebels in Nicaragua.
 November 22 – Mike Tyson wins his first world boxing title by defeating Trevor Berbick in Las Vegas, becoming the youngest heavyweight champion ever at age 20. 
 November 25 – Iran-Contra Affair: U.S. Attorney General Edwin Meese announces that profits from covert weapons sales to Iran were illegally diverted to the anti-communist Contra rebels in Nicaragua.
 November 26 – Iran-Contra Affair: U.S. President Ronald Reagan announces that as of December 1, former Senator John Tower, former Secretary of State Edmund Muskie, and former National Security Adviser Brent Scowcroft will serve as members of the Special Review Board looking into the scandal (they became known as the Tower Commission). Reagan denies involvement in the scandal.

December
 December – The unemployment rate drops to 6.6%, the lowest since March 1980.
 December 20 – Three African Americans are assaulted by a group of white teens in the Howard Beach neighborhood of Queens, New York. One of the victims, Michael Griffith, is run over and killed by a motorist while attempting to flee the attackers.
 December 26 – After 35 years on the airwaves and holding the title of longest-running non-news program on network television, NBC airs the final episode of daytime drama Search for Tomorrow.
 December 31 – A fire at the Dupont Plaza Hotel in San Juan, Puerto Rico, kills 97 and injures 140.

Ongoing
 Cold War (1947–1991)
 Iran–Contra affair (1985–1987)

Undated
O-Zone Inc media production company is founded in New York City.

Births
Those born in the year 1986 are considered millennials (Generation Y or Gen Y).

January

 January 1
 Ramses Barden, football player
 Glen Davis, basketball player
 Mayra Flores, Mexican-born politician
 January 2
 Jeff Bauman, author and victim in the Boston Marathon Bombing
 Scott Burley, football player
 Trombone Shorty, trumpet player and composer
 January 3
 Mackenzy Bernadeau, football player
 Jenn Bostic, Christian and country singer/songwriter
 Lloyd, urban musician
 January 4
 Deon Butler, football player
 Maria Lamb, Olympic speed skater
 Steve Slaton, football player
 Emilia Sykes, politician
 Charlyne Yi, actress
 January 5 
 J. P. Arencibia, baseball player
 Jesse Draper, talk show host
 January 6 
 Mike Teel, football player
 Shane Sweet, actor
 Michelle Waterson, mixed martial artist and model
 January 7
 Baby DC, rapper
 Yummy Bingham, singer/songwriter
 Ryan Christian, football player
 JamesOn Curry, basketball player
 Ramon Foster, football player
 January 8 – Ben Yu, poker player
 January 9 – Jonathan Compas, football player
 January 10
 Trevor Canfield, football player
 Marcus Freeman, football player and coach
 January 12
 Christopher Celiz, U.S. Army sergeant and Medal of Honor recipient (d. 2018)
 Saikat Chakrabarti, political advisor and software engineer
 Deena Nicole Cortese, TV personality
 January 13 – Aaron Pixton, Mathematician
 January 14
 Laurel Abrahamson, volleyball player
 Gary Brolsma, musician and singer
 Matt Riddle, wrestler and mixed martial artist
 January 15
 Andrew Craig, mixed martial artist
 Glover Quin, football player
 Jessy Schram, actress
 January 16
 Reid Brignac, baseball player
 Gerald Cadogan, football player
 Mason Gamble, actor
 Mark Trumbo, baseball player
 January 17
 Max Adler, actor
 Hale Appleman, actor
 Dan Campbell, singer and frontman for The Wonder Years
 Jeremiah Fraites, musician, composer, songwriter, and multi-instrumentalist
 Chloe Lattanzi, singer and actress
 January 18
 Chedda Da Connect, rapper
 Devin Kelley, actress
 Eugene Lee Yang, filmmaker, actor and internet celebrity
 Becca Tobin, actress and singer
 January 19
 Julian Cyr, politician
 Sara Mearns, ballerina
 January 20
 Derek Fathauer, golfer
 Bryan Lerg, hockey player
 January 21
 Edson Barboza, mixed martial artist
 Peyton Hillis, football player
 Phil Loadholt, football player
 Jonathan Quick, hockey player
 January 22 – Larry English, football player
 January 23 – Michael Stevens, YouTuber and educator
 January 24
 Mischa Barton, British-born actress
 Michael Brennan, ice hockey player
 Aimee Carter, author
 Tyler Flowers, baseball player
 Jack Hillen, hockey player
 Vinny Marseglia, wrestler
 January 25 – Brian McClellan, epic fantasy author
 Andy Dirks, baseball player
 January 26
 Kizzmekia Corbett, immunologist
 Gerald Green, basketball player
 Matt Heafy, musician and frontman for Trivium
 Taylor Wilde, wrestler
 January 27
 Iana Kasian, Ukrainian-born prosecutor and murder victim (d. 2016)
 Kendall Langford, football player
 January 29
 Drew Tyler Bell, actor and dancer
 Michael Blatchford, cyclist
 Chris Bourque, ice hockey player
 Sarah Jaffe, singer
 Todd Peck, stock car racer
 January 30
 Matt Blumenthal, politician
 Ashley Buccille, actress
 Sean Caisse, stock car racing driver
 Nick Evans, baseball player
 Andrew Giuliani, political adviser, political candidate, and son of former NYC Mayor Rudy Giuliani
 Jordan Pacheco, baseball player
 January 31
 Kyle Altman, soccer player
 Walter Dix, sprinter

February

 February 1
 Christopher Abbott, actor
 Lauren Conrad, TV personality, fashion designer and author
 Justin Deeley, actor and model
 Justin Sellers, baseball player
 February 2
 Raul Amaya, mixed martial artist
 Tiffany Vise, figure skater
 February 3 – Justin Alferman, politician
 February 4 – Vin Gerard, wrestler
 February 5
 Elizabeth Alderfer, actress
 Jamie Brewer, actress and model
 Daryll Clark, football player
 Kevin Gates, hip-hop musician and entrepreneur
 Madison Rayne, wrestler
 Reed Sorenson, stock car racer
 February 6
 Jamaal Anderson, football player
 Dane DeHaan, actor
 Alice Greczyn, actress and model
 Reshard Langford, football player
 February 7
 Hermes Bautista, actor
 Kelly Choi, television personality
 Stephen Colletti, actor and television personality
 Josh Collmenter, baseball player
 James Deen, pornographic actor and director
 T.J. Dillashaw, mixed martial artist
 Timothy Reifsnyder, actor
 February 8
 Matt Bush, baseball player
 Anderson Paak, musician and record producer
 Tom Rogan, English-born journalist
 February 9
 Adrian Banks, American-born Israeli basketball player
 Noah Strycker, birdwatcher
 February 10
 Jeff Adrien, basketball player
 Josh Akognon, basketball player
 Roger Allen III, football player
 Daniel Antúnez, soccer player
 Blanca, Puerto Rican-born Christian singer/songwriter
 February 11
 P. J. Brennan, actor
 Jeremy Bryan, boxer
 February 12
 Brandon Allen, baseball player
 Eric Brunner, soccer player
 Jonny Chops, rock musician
 Valorie Curry, actress
 February 13
 Chase Bullock, football player
 Susan Dunklee, Olympic biathlete
 Aqib Talib, football player
 February 14
 Mark Anderson, golfer
 Cody Balogh, football player
 Travis Banwart, baseball player
 Sterling Flunder, soccer player
 Tiffany Thornton, actress, TV personality, and singer
 February 15
 Nick Eversman, actor
 Amber Riley, actress, singer, and author
 February 16 – Matt Case, ice hockey player
 February 17
 Rich Costanzo. soccer player
 Brett Kern, football player
 Daphne Oz, TV host, food writer, and chef
 February 18
 Jack Allison, writer, podcaster, and comedian
 Cameron Clapp, amputee and motivational speaker
 Robert DeLong, electronic musician
 Dumbfoundead, Argentine-born rapper and actor
 Brandon Flowers, football player
 February 19
 Terence Brown, football player
 Michael Schwimer, baseball player and businessman
 February 20
 Julio Borbón, baseball player
 Chukwudi Chijindu, soccer player
 February 21
 Cadence Weapon, Canadian-born rapper
 February 22
 Miko Hughes, actor
 Rajon Rondo, basketball player
 February 23
 Jack Abraham, businessperson, serial entrepreneur, and investor
 Skylar Grey, pop singer
 Jerod Mayo, football player
 February 24
 Katie Burkhart, softball player
 Bryce Papenbrook, voice actor
 February 25
 Jay Ayres, soccer player
 Callum Black, American-born Irish rugby player
 Justin Berfield, actor, writer, and producer
 Erik Cordier, baseball player
 Tony Perry, lead guitarist for Pierce the Veil
 February 26 – JWoww, TV personality
 February 27
 Nicky Anosike, basketball player
 Folarin Campbell, basketball player
 Anthony Fahden, Olympic rower
 Daniel Gibson, basketball player
 Ashthon Jones, singer
 February 28
 David Bentz, politician
 Olivia Palermo, entrepreneur, model, fashion influencer, and TV personality
 Eugene Puryear, journalist, author, activist, and political candidate

March

 March 1
 Chris Baker, golfer
 Big E, wrestler, voice actor, football player, and powerlifter 
 Jonathan Spector, soccer player
 March 2 – Ethan Peck, actor
 March 3
 Daniel Anderson, musician and record producer
 Dominic Cianciarulo, soccer player
 Jed Collins, football player
 Eric Farris, baseball player
 Stacie Orrico, singer
 March 4
 Dalton Castle, wrestler
 Audrey Esparza, actress
 Margo Harshman, actress
 Mike Krieger, Brazilian-born entrepreneur, software engineer, and co-founder of Instagram
 Caesar Rayford, football player
 March 5
 Christylez Bacon, hip hop artist
 Corey Brewer, basketball player
 Cameron Colvin, football player
 Jason Fuchs, actor and screenwriter
 Julie Henderson, model
 Andrew Jenks, film maker
 Sarah J. Maas, novelist
 March 6
 Jake Arrieta, baseball player
 Evan Bush, soccer player
 Timothy DeLaGhetto, media personality
 Eli Marienthal, actor
 March 7
 Ryan Ciminelli, bowler
 George Salazar, actor, singer, and musician
 March 8 – Chad Gable, wrestler 
 March 9
 Jason DeSantis, hockey player
 Tim Pool, podcaster
 Brittany Snow, actress
 March 10 – Summer Edward, Trinidadian-born writer, children's editor, educator, literary activist and children's literature specialist
 March 11
 Aleah Chapin, painter
 Dorthia Cottrell, singer and frontperson for Windhand
 Marc Okubo, guitarist for Veil of Maya
 March 12
 Chris Burkard, photographer and artist
 Joey Butler, baseball player
 March 13 – Ashley Charters, softball player
 March 14
 Corey Ashe, soccer player
 Kim Conley, Olympic middle and long distance runner
 March 15
 Natalie Prass, singer/songwriter
 Chilo Rachal, football player
 Darell Scott, football player
 March 16
 Andy Cherry, Christian singer/songwriter
 Alexandra Daddario, actress
 Ken Doane, wrestler
 Kenny Dykstra, wrestler
 T.J. Jordan, basketball player
 Mickey Storey, baseball player
 March 17
 Chris Clemence, bassist
 Margaret Crowley, Olympic speed skater
 Olesya Rulin, Russian-born actress
 March 18
 Darius Butler, football player
 Simon Curtis, singer/songwriter, record producer, and actor
 Jared Gaither, football player
 March 19
 Ahmad Bradshaw, football player
 Chris Crenshaw, baseball player and coach
 Anne Vyalitsyna, Russian-born model
 March 20
 Justin Bostrom, ice hockey player
 Rachel Fannan, singer/songwriter, musician, and poet
 Cecil Newton, football player
 Sammus, rapper
 March 21
 Rob Bruggeman, football player
 Scott Eastwood, actor
 March 22
 Matt Bush, actor
 David Choi, music and internet personality
 Dexter Fowler, baseball player
 March 23
 Konstantin Batygin, Russian-born astronomer and professor at Caltech
 Patrick Cowan, Canadian-born football player
 Brett Eldredge, country music singer
 Steven Strait, actor
 Lisa Surihani, Malaysian-born actress
 March 24
 Miles Craigwell, rugby player
 Valentin Chmerkovskiy, Ukrainian-born dancer
 Kyle Maynard, motivational speaker, author, and No Excuses CrossFit Gym owner
 March 25
 Megan Gibson, softball player
 Kyle Lowry, basketball player
 March 26
 Danita Angell, model
 Matt Castelo, football player
 Keith Cothran, basketball player
 Jonny Craig, Canadian-born singer/songwriter for Dance Gavin Dance (2007-2012), Emarosa (2008-2012), and Slaves (2014-2018)
 Misty Stone, pornographic actress
 March 27
 Titus Brown, football player
 Brittani Coury, Paralympic snowboarder
 Bonnie Gordon, actress and singer
 SoCal Val, wrestling personality
 March 28 
 Mustafa Ali, wrestler 
 Bowe Bergdahl, US Army soldier and deserter captured by the Taliban
 Justin Brantly, football player
 Lady Gaga, pop singer/songwriter
 J-Kwon, rapper
 Evan Rankin, hockey player
 March 29 – Lucas Elliot Eberl, actor and director
 March 30
 Tyrone Brazelton, basketball player
 Tessa Ferrer, actress
 March 31
 Add-2, rapper
 Brandon Copeland, football player
 Peter Silberman, guitarist and vocalist for The Antlers

April

 April 1
 Ellen Hollman, actress
 Kid Ink, hip-hop singer
 Hillary Scott, musician
 April 2
 Mykki Blanco, rapper, performance artist, poet, and activist
 Marcus Brown, football player
 Lee DeWyze, rock musician
 Drew Van Acker, actor
 April 3
 Amanda Bynes, actress
 Stephanie Cox, soccer player
 Whitney Reynolds, television talk show host, podcast host, producer, and philanthropist
 April 4
 Callista Balko, softball player
 Nicole Bush, long-distance runner
 Anthony Carter, baseball player
 Louis Coleman, baseball player
 April 5
 Anna Sophia Berglund, actress, model, Playmate, and reality show personality
 Ryan Brehm, golfer
 Steve Clevenger, baseball player
 Charlotte Flair, wrestler, authoress, and actress 
 Erica Rhodes, actress and comedian
 April 6
 Kay Adams, sportscaster
 Aaron Curry, football player
 April 7
 Mike Anderson, basketball player
 Brooke Brodack, internet personality
 Ashleigh Clare-Kearney, gymnast
 Dustin J. Lee, Marine dog handler and IED detector (d. 2007)
 Ashlee Palmer, football player
 Joe Radinovich, politician
 Jason Ralph, actor and producer
 April 8
 Cliff Avril, football player
 Slamtana, Dominican-born baseball player
 Aviva Silverman, artist and activist
 April 9
 Atsugiri Jason, comedian
 Kevin Brock, football player
 Paul Fanaika, football player
 Jeff Lerg, hockey player
 Jordan Masterson, actor
 Leighton Meester, actress
 April 10
 Ally Baker, tennis player
 Candi CdeBaca, politician
 April 11
 The Twinnies, television personalities and twins
 Connor Barth, football player
 Amber Bullock, gospel artist and musician
 Russ Canzler, baseball player
 Paul Cauthen, singer/songwriter
 Brian Clarhaut, soccer player and coach
 Troy Cole, soccer player
 Stephanie Pratt, TV personality
 April 12
 Zerina Akers, fashion stylist and costume designer
 Joe Amabile, television personality
 Kira Bilecky, American-born Peruvian footballer
 Brad Brach, baseball player
 Matt McGorry, actor and activist
 Dan Strauss, politician
 April 13 – Lorenzo Cain, baseball player
 April 14
 Morenike Atunrase, basketball player
 Quianna Chaney, basketball player
 Steve Clark, soccer player
 Max Unger, football player
 April 15 – Rudy Carpenter, football player
 April 16
 Joanna Beasley, Christian pop artist
 Sufe Bradshaw, actress
 Kristiana Rae Colón, poet, playwright, actor, and educator
 April 18
 Billy Butler, baseball player
 Chris Crane, football player
 Maurice Edu, soccer player
 April 19
 Antoine Caldwell, football player
 Jake Carter, football player and wrestler
 Candace Parker, basketball player
 Karlee Leilani Perez, wrestler, model, and actress
 April 20 – Jess Todd, baseball player
 April 21 – Audra Cohen, tennis player
 April 22
 Amanda Berry, author and abduction survivor
 Darren Fells, football player
 Amber Heard, actress
 Marshawn Lynch, football player
 Chuck Taylor, wrestler
 April 23
 Jessie Godderz, wrestler
 April 24
 Brian Barnwell, politician
 Michael Chandler, mixed martial artist
 Cameron Cogburn, cyclist
 Eli Cook, singer/songwriter and guitarist
 Aaron Cunningham, baseball player
 Kellin Quinn, singer and frontman for Sleeping With Sirens
 April 25
 John DeLuca, actor and singer
 Gwen Jorgensen, triathlete
 Derek Thorn, stock car racer
 Joy Villa, singer/songwriter
 April 26
 Morgan Cox, football player
 Cris Crotz, beauty pageant titleholder
 Sean Evans, YouTuber and producer
 Braden Gellenthien, compound bow archer
 Mortty Ivy, football player
 Aaron Meeks, actor
 April 27 – Trindon Holliday, football player
 April 28
 Ashley Bland Manlove, politician
 Dave Bliss, basketball coach
 Collin Cowgill, baseball player
 Dillon Gee, baseball player
 Ryan Saunders, basketball coach
 Jenna Ushkowitz, South Korean-born actress, singer and podcast host
 April 29
 Renee Alway, fashion model
 Junior Aumavae, football player
 Sean Backman, hockey player
 Jennifer Chieng, mixed martial artist
 Black Cobain, rapper
 Chris Farren, indie punk musician
 Justin Flom, magician
 Dustin Hazelett, mixed martial artist
 April 30 – Dianna Agron, actress, singer and dancer

May

 May 1
 Bob Andrzejczak, politician
 Arkeith Brown, football player
 Dakota Cochrane, mixed martial artist
 Chris Coy, actor
 Cassie Jaye, actress and film director
 TBHits, record producer, songwriter, and rapper
 May 2
 Emily Hart, actress and voice actress
 Thomas McDonell, actor, musician, and artist
 May 3 – Homer Bailey, baseball player
 May 4 – Nate Novarro, drummer for Cobra Starship
 May 5
 Russell Allen, football player
 Will Anderson, singer/songwriter
 Bart Baker, internet personality and entertainer
 May 6
 Sam Alvey, mixed martial artist
 Ryan Cordeiro, soccer player
 C. J. Spillman, football player
 Sasheer Zamata, actress and comedian
 May 7
 Nate Prosser, hockey player
 Frances Quinlan, singer/songwriter
 Craig Steltz, football player
 May 8
 Alex Deibold, Olympic snowboarder
 Ray Feinga, football player
 Laura Spencer, actress
 Garrett Temple, basketball player
 May 9
 Taylor Chace, ice sledge hockey player
 Yu-kai Chou, Taiwanese-born entrepreneur, author, speaker, business consultant, and experience designer
 FPSRussia, podcaster and YouTuber
 Grace Gummer, actress
 John Pfeiffer, politician
 Daniel Schlereth, baseball player
 May 10
 Amanda Cinalli, soccer player
 Geoff Foster, politician
 May 11
 Tia Ballard, voice actress and director
 Scott Bauhs, runner
 May 12
 Dana Belben, voice actress, animator, screenwriter, effects artist, and comedian
 George Josten, soccer player
 May 13
 Morgan Arritola, Olympic cross country skier
 Jared Boll, hockey player
 Lena Dunham, actress and producer
 May 14
 David Crowley, politician
 Madi Diaz, singer/songwriter
 Lawrence Timmons, football player
 May 15
 Brandon Barnes, baseball player
 Thomas Brown, football player and coach
 Claire Buffie, photographer and beauty pageant winner
 Josh Johnson, football player
 Andy Levitre, football player
 May 16
 Anthony Birchak, mixed martial artist
 Megan Fox, actress and model
 Drew Roy, actor
 Jacob Zachar, actor
 May 17
 David Benefield, poker player
 Raehann Bryce-Davis, mezzo-soprano and producer
 Eric Lloyd, actor, comedian, musician and producer
 Tahj Mowry, actor
 Jaime Preciado, bassist and vocalist for Pierce the Veil
 May 18
 Ezra Cohen-Watnick, intelligence official in the United States National Security Council
 Tony Succar, Peruvian-born musician, producer, and composer
 May 19
 Brandon Carr, football player
 Mario Chalmers, basketball player
 Danny Havoc, wrestler (d. 2020)
 Eric Lloyd, actor, comedian, musician, and producer
 May 20
 Alessandra Biaggi, politician
 Samra Brouk, politician
 Yolanda Brown, singer (d. 2007)
 Louisa Krause, actress
 Richard Nelson, politician
 Marcus Titus, swimmer
 May 21
 Omar Hussein, content creator and media and communications consultant
 Ricardo Lockette, football player
 May 22
 Devin Clark, football player
 Collin Cowgill, baseball player
 Julian Edelman, football player
 Molly Ephraim, actress
 Sean Rad, entrepreneur and co-founder of Tinder
 Shann Schillinger, football player
 A. Q. Shipley, football player
 May 23
 Ty G. Allushuski, sports writer, editor, publisher, and social media communications expert
 Jimmy Baron, basketball player
 Andrew Beck, artist and musician
 Steve Billirakis, poker player
 Nico Colaluca, footballer
 Ryan Coogler, film director, producer, and screenwriter
 Chad Hall, football player
 Tim Hightower, football player
 Jordan Zimmermann, baseball player
 May 24
 Mark Ballas, dancer, actor, and musician
 Bryon Bishop, football player
 Tony Carter, football player
 May 25
 Andrew Golden, school shooter and perpetrator of the Westside School Shooting (d. 2019)
 Octavio Pisano, Mexican-born actor
 May 26
 Beau Bell, football player
 Jerome Boyd, football player
 Tyler Haskins, hockey player
 Jeremy Stephens, mixed martial artist
 May 27
 Matt Barnes, football player and coach
 Will Campuzano, Mexican-born mixed martial artist
 May 28
 Alex Feather Akimov, Russian-born guitarist and composer
 Adrian Clark, boxer
 Joseph Cross, actor
 Bryant Dunston, basketball player
 Britt McHenry, sports reporter
 Seth Rollins, wrestler
 May 29
 Daryl Campbell, politician
 Maurice Crum Jr., football player
 Danny Eslick, motorcycle racer
 Hornswoggle, wrestler and actor
 May 30
 Tony Campana, baseball player
 Jade Novah, singer and internet personality
 Will Peltz, actor
 May 31
 Jordan Angeli, soccer player
 Brooke Castile, figure skater
 Waka Flocka Flame, rapper

June

 June 1 – Danny Burgess, politician
 June 2
 Tyler Bradt, kayaker
 Curtis Lofton, football player
 ZZ Ward, singer/songwriter
 June 3
 Joseph Cheong, poker player
 Robby Felix, football player
 Brenden Jefferson, actor
 Zach Lutz, baseball player
 Josh Segarra, actor
 June 4 – Albert McClellan, football player
 June 5 – Vernon Gholston, football player
 June 6
 Danesha Adams, soccer player
 Justin Allgaier, race car driver
 Collin Balester, baseball player
 Henry Beck, politician
 Leslie Carter, pop singer (d. 2012)
 Rachelle Dekker, novelist
 David Karp, web developer and entrepreneur, founder of Tumblr
 June 7
 Keegan Bradley, golfer
 Todd Carter, football player
 June 9
 Caroline Bruce, Olympic swimmer
 Brooks Foster, football player
 June 10
 Brian Connelly, hockey player
 Joey Zimmerman, actor and musician
 June 11
 Nate Bowie, basketball player and coach
 Chase Clement, football player
 Andrew Cray, LGBT rights activist (d. 2014)
 Shia LaBeouf, actor
 June 12
 Erik Ainge, football player
 Ely Allen, soccer player
 Alexis Crimes, volleyball player
 Jessica Keenan Wynn, actress
 June 13 
 Denise Bidot, model
 Kat Dennings, actress
 Clyde Gates, football player
 Mary-Kate and Ashley Olsen, twin actresses and fashion designers
 June 14
 Chris Barnett, mixed martial artist
 Haley Hudson, actress
 Ray Rosas, wrestler
 June 15 – Trevor Plouffe, baseball player
 June 16 – Josh Sitton, football player
 June 17 – Joe Crawford, basketball player
 June 18
 Natasha Allegri, animation creator, writer, and comic book artist
 Steve Cishek, baseball player
 Caleb Joseph, baseball player
 Brandon Lang, football player
 Crystal Renn, model and author
 Claire Thomas, food enthusiast, blogger, and TV show host
 Matt Walsh, right-wing commentator
 June 19
 Jason Michael Brescia, writer and director
 Erin Mackey, actress and singer
 Marvin Williams, basketball player
 June 20
 DJ Boldin, football player
 Allie Quigley, basketball player
 Dreama Walker, actress
 June 21
 Rockne Brubaker, pair skater
 Charlie Cole, Olympic rower
 Zachary Rhyner, USAF combat controller and Air Force Cross recipient
 June 22
 Lashrecse Aird, politician
 Dwayne Anderson, basketball player
 Bob the Drag Queen, drag queen and TV personality
 Marlon Favorite, football player
 June 23
 Christy Altomare, actress and singer/songwriter
 Michael Annett, stock car racing driver
 Sonya Balmores, actress, model, surfer, and pageant winner
 June 24
 Caroline Burckle, Olympic swimmer
 Kelly Carrington, model and clothing designer
 Jessamyn Duke, wrestler and mixed martial artist
 Phil Hughes, baseball player
 Solange Knowles, actress and singer
 Shea Salinas, soccer player
 Brandon Underwood, football player
 June 25
 Sean Barnette, basketball player
 Charlie Davies, soccer player
 Bradley Fletcher, football player
 Gabriele Grunewald, track-and-field athlete (d. 2019)
 Monogem, singer
 June 26
 Brittney Karbowski, voice actress
 Angelina Pivarnick, television personality, model, and singer
 June 27
 Drake Bell, actor, singer/songwriter and multi-instrumentalist
 Bryan Fletcher, Nordic combined skier
 LaShawn Merritt, Olympic sprinter
 Kristal Uzelac, artistic gymnast
 June 28
 Scooter Berry, football player
 Matteo Lane, comedian, opera singer, and oil painter
 Kellie Pickler, singer
 Z Berg, singer
 June 29
 Perry Baker, rugby player
 Casey J, Gospel singer
 Serena Deeb, wrestler
 Disasterpeace, musician and composer
 June 30
 Demetrius Byrd, football player
 Mike Carp, baseball player
 Alicia Fox, wrestler and model
 Kevin Jurovich, football player

July

 July 1
 Garrett Adelstein, poker player
 Charlie Blackmon, baseball player
 Rachel Summerlyn, wrestler
 July 2
 Brett Cecil, baseball player
 Kendrick Farris, Olympic weightlifter
 Lindsay Lohan, actress, pop singer, and model
 July 3
 Jerome Felton, football player
 Caleb Sean, musician
 Nick Schaus, hockey player
 July 4
 Justin Anderson, football player
 Shane Barnett, politician
 Jaclyn Betham, actress and ballerina
 Sebastián Botero, American-born Colombian soccer player
 July 5
 Tal and Oren Alexander, real estate moguls
 Kayden Coleman, transgender advocate, educator, and social media influencer
 Joelle Forte, figure skater
 July 6
 Leon Frierson, actor and comedian
 Derrick Williams, football player
 July 7
 Lauren Andino, artist, skateboarder, musician, and co-founder of DL Skateboards
 Raphael Cox, soccer player
 Ana Kasparian, political commentator
 Jerome Singleton, Paralympic track-and-field athlete
 Sevyn Streeter, singer
 July 8
 Leon Abravanel, soccer coach
 Kevin Chappell, golfer
 Brittany Force, drag racer
 Jake McDorman, actor
 July 9
 Antoine Cason, football player
 Dominic Cervi, soccer player 
 Simon Dumont, freestyle skier
 Katie Stam, Miss America 2009
 Brandon Uranowitz, actor
 Kiely Williams, actress and singer
 July 10 – Wyatt Russell, actor
 July 11
 Bryan Augenstein, baseball player
 Derek Sanders, singer and frontman for Mayday Parade
 Geoff Schwartz, football player
 July 12 – Etchu Tabe, Cameroonian-born soccer player
 July 13
 dakotaz, YouTuber and Twitch streamer
 Denise Bidot, model
 July 14 – Elbert Mack, football player
 July 15
 Yahya Abdul-Mateen II, actor
 Stephanie Andujar, actress, director, producer, writer, dancer, and singer/songwriter
 Ari Aster, director, screenwriter, and producer
 David Clark, politician
 Brandon Sumrall, football player
 July 17
 Jason Aalon Butler, singer and political activist
 Brando Eaton, actor
 Mojo Rawley, wrestler and football player
 July 18 – Angel Deradoorian, musician
 July 19
 Atossa Araxia Abrahamian, journalist
 Jarell Christian, basketball player and coach
 July 21
 Jonni Cheatwood, visual artist
 Michael Doneger, film director, screenwriter, and actor
 Betty Gilpin, actress
 Diane Guerrero, actress
 July 22
 Jolene Anderson, basketball player
 Colette Appel, pair skater
 Shawn Chrystopher, rapper and music producer
 Coleman Collins, basketball player
 Chad Costello, ice hockey player
 Sean Lee, football player
 Kellyn Taylor, long distance runner
 July 23
 Andrew Carignan, baseball player
 Kenwin Cummings, football player
 July 24
 Richie Brockel, football player
 Justin Berry, victim of child sexual abuse
 July 26
 Travis Brown, football player
 Monica Raymund, actress
 July 27
 Hala Alyan, writer, poet, and clinical psychologist
 Felecia Angelle, voice actress and ADR director
 DeMarre Carroll, basketball player
 Jessica Eye, mixed martial artist
 Ryan Flaherty, baseball player
 Maebe A. Girl, drag queen and politician
 July 28
 Alex Bleeker, guitarist for Real Estate
 Essence Carson, basketball player
 Alexandra Chando, actress
 Darin Ruf, baseball player
 July 30
 Robert Brewster, football player
 Mike Carp, baseball player
 Tom Dwan, poker player
 Danielle Keaton, actress
 July 31
 Sean Eldridge, Canadian-born political activist
 Frank Foster, politician
 Markice Moore, actor and TV personality

August

 August 1
 Brent Cobb, country singer/songwriter
 Josh Harder, politician
 Elijah Kelley, actor, singer, and dancer
 August 2
 Dominique Barber, football player
 Kesha Ram, politician
 August 3
 Landon Cohen, football player
 Remy Le Boeuf, instrumentalist, musician, and composer
 Andrew McFarlane, actor
 August 4
 Nick Augusto, drummer for Trivium (2009–2014) and Light the Torch (2016–2017)
 Joique Bell, football player
 Alex Castellanos, baseball player
 August 5
 Brendon Ryan Barrett, actor and coach
 Paula Creamer, golfer
 Maria D'Luz, Mexican-born singer/songwriter
 Tyler Herron, baseball player (d. 2021)
 Blake Masters, venture capitalist, author, political candidate, and president of the Thiel Foundation
 August 6
 Tony Bergstrom, football player
 Erik Condra, ice hockey player
 August 7
 Kevin Barnett, actor and comedian (d. 2019)
 Keahu Kahuanui, actor 
 Katie Sowers, NFL football coach 
 August 8
 Brendan Blumer, entrepreneur, executive, and investor
 Jackie Cruz, Dominican-born actress, singer, and model
 Peyton List, actress
 Chris Pressley, football player
 August 9
 Patrick Cannone, ice hockey player
 Magibon, YouTuber and internet personality
 Telle Smith, singer and frontman for The Word Alive 
 August 10
 Steve Aponavicius football player
 Ketia Swanier, basketball player
 August 11
 Henry Corrales, mixed martial artist
 Antoniette Costa, singer/songwriter and co-founder of Humans of Fashion Foundation
 Colby Rasmus, baseball player
 Pablo Sandoval, Venezuelan-born baseball player
 August 12
 Kyle Arrington, football player
 Steve Cantwell, mixed martial artist
 August 13
 Demetrius Johnson, mixed martial artist
 Wesley Taylor, actor and writer
 August 14 – Matt Castlen, politician
 August 15
 Chad Beyer, cyclist
 Jake Christensen, football player
 Samantha Crain, singer/songwriter
 Katie Gallagher, fashion designer
 August 16
 Bill Morrissey, wrestler
 Shawn Pyfrom, actor and singer 
 August 17
 Graham Bensinger, journalist
 Leigh Ann Brown, soccer player
 Piotr Czech, Polish-born football player
 Deborah Feldman, American-born German writer
 Bryton James, actor
 Tyrus Thomas. basketball player
 August 18
 Andy Bisek, wrestler
 Lisa Chesson, hockey player
 Tony Cruz, baseball player
 Sam Mehran, pop and rock musician for the band Test Icicles (d.2018)
 Miesha Tate, mixed martial artist
 August 19
 Austin Adams, baseball player
 Drew Adams, lacrosse player
 Nathan Brown, football player and coach
 JTM, rapper
 Christina Perri, pop and rock musician
 August 20
 Tramaine Brock, football player
 Shan Foster, basketball player
 August 21
 Jason Boltus, football player
 Shenea Booth, gymnast
 Brooks Wheelan, actor, comedian and writer
 August 22
 Andray Blatche, American-born Filipino basketball player
 Tony Fiammetta, football player
 August 23
 Ayron Jones, musician
 Neil Cicierega, internet artist
 August 24 
 Nick Adenhart, baseball player (d. 2009)
 Arian Foster, football player
 Aaron Lee Tasjan, singer/songwriter
 TaQuita Thorns, singer/songwriter
 August 25
 Ervin Baldwin, football player
 Rodney Ferguson, football player
 August 26
 Jimmy P. Anderson, politician
 Big K.R.I.T., rapper
 Jane Bugaeva, Russian-born figure skater
 Cassie Ventura, singer/songwriter, model, actress and dancer
 August 27
 Joe Fitzgibbon, politician
 Mario, singer/songwriter, actor, dancer, and model
 August 28
 Shelby Bach, author
 Armie Hammer, actor
 August 29
 Nicole Byer, comedian, actress, television host, podcaster, and author
 Lea Michele, actress, singer and author
 August 30 – Ryan Ross, guitarist for Panic! At the Disco
 August 31
 Graham Biehl, sailor
 Ryan Kelley, actor

September

 September 1
 Brian Broderick, baseball player
 Calais Campbell, football player
 Antonio Coleman, football player
 Sidney Rice, football player
 September 2
 Dimple Ajmera, Indian-born politician
 Jordon Banfield, baseball coach
 Corey Cogdell, Olympic trapshooter
 Evan Crawford, baseball player
 September 3
 Brandon Beachy, baseball player
 Lorenz Larkin, mixed martial artist
 Shaun White, snowboarder and skateboarder
 September 4
 Jaclyn Hales, actress
 Xavier Woods, wrestler
 September 5
 John Bartholomew, chess player
 Nicholas Ciarelli, journalist
 Raphael Cruz, acrobat and actor (d. 2018)
 Brittany Furlan, internet personality and comedian
 Ezra Furman, singer/songwriter and frontman for Ezra Furman and the Harpoons
 Nate Ness, football player
 September 6
 Darmirra Brunson, actress, comedian, and singer
 Ryan Clady, football player
 Raven Riley, pornographic actress
 September 7
 Colin Delaney, wrestler
 Troy Nolan, football player
 September 8
 Leah LaBelle, singer/songwriter (d. 2018)
 Jake Sandvig, actor
 Logan Schafer, baseball player
 September 9
 Stanley Arnoux, football player
 Michael Bowden, baseball player
 Steven Cisar, BMX rider
 Jason Lamy-Chappuis, American-born, French Olympic skier
 Mike Lawler, politician
 September 10
 Zach Arnett, football player and coach
 Ginger Costa-Jackson, Italian-born opera singer
 Henrique Couto, writer and director
 Greg Garbowsky, musician
 Traci Stumpf, actress and comedian
 TAC, football player and wrestler
 September 11
 Kyle Blanks, baseball player
 Andrew Cashner, baseball player
 Dwayne Jarrett, football player
 LaToya Sanders, basketball player
 Cletus Seldin, boxer
 September 12
 Andre Ricks, basketball player and owner of Rawimpact clothing brand
 Emmy Rossum, actress and singer
 September 14
 Greg Boone, football player
 Dane Fletcher, football player
 Harrison Greenbaum, comedian
 A. J. Trauth, actor and musician
 September 15
 Kevin Barnes, football player
 Jeremy Boone, football player
 Kyle Carr, Olympic speed skater
 Dionte Christmas, basketball player
 Jenna Marbles, youtuber
 Heidi Montag, TV personality
 September 16
 Gordon Beckham, baseball player 
 Matt Fodge, football player
 Ian Harding, German-born actor 
 Kyla Pratt, actress and musician 
 Nikko Jenkins, spree killer
 September 17
 Wes Allen, soccer player
 Emily Cook, beauty pageant titleholder
 Abby Rosmarin, model and writer
 September 18
 Kyle Burkhart, football player
 Danielle Jonas, reality TV personality
 September 19
 Stephanie Allynne, actress, writer, and comedian
 Mandy Musgrave, actress
 Ryan Succop, football player
 Peter Vack, actor
 September 20
 Jordan Chariton, investigative reporter
 Courtney Fells, basketball player
 Aldis Hodge, actor
 A.J. Ramos, baseball player
 September 21
 Brad Benjamin, golfer
 Robby Blackwell, singer/songwriter, producer, and instrumentalist
 Grete Eliassen, American-born Norwegian Olympic freestyle skier
 Lindsey Stirling, violinist, dancer, performance artist, and composer
 September 22
 David Arconti, politician
 Nathaniel Brazill, convicted murderer
 Derek Cox, football player
 Heather Dorff, actress, writer, and producer
 Jennifer Elie, tennis player
 Wesley Harris, politician
 Artemio Reyes, boxer
 Chris Schwinden, baseball player
 September 23 – Kaylee DeFer, actress 
 September 24
 Leah Dizon, singer and model
 Eloise Mumford, actress
 September 25
 Steve Forrest, drummer
 Jamie Franks, soccer player
 September 26
 Brooke Allison, singer
 Ned Crotty, lacrosse player
 Sean Doolittle, baseball player
 Scot Kerns, politician
 September 27
 Brian Ackley, soccer player
 Matt Shoemaker, baseball player
 September 28
 Mari Andrew, writer, speaker, and illustrator
 Jermelle Cudjo, football player
 September 29
 Lo Bosworth, TV personality and CEO of Love Wellness
 Lisa Foiles, actress, presenter, video game journalist, model, and author
 Matt Lashoff, hockey player
 Jordan Norwood, football player
 Zac Robinson, football player and coach
 Zach Stewart, baseball player
 September 30
 James Barnett, entrepreneur and community activist
 Ki Hong Lee, South Korean-born actor

October

 October 1
 Jon Cooper, football player
 Jurnee Smollett, actress
 October 2
 Camilla Belle, actress
 Stu Bickel, hockey player
 October 3
 Kyle Brotzman, football player
 Heidi Feek, singer/songwriter
 Melanie Fontana, singer/songwriter and composer
 October 4
 Stephen Fife, baseball player
 Lauren Underwood, politician 
 October 5
 Jeff Bianchi, baseball player
 Kevin Bigley, actor
 Tanner Roark, baseball player
 Joaquin Wilde, wrestler
 October 6 – Olivia Thirlby, actress
 October 7
 Celeste Beryl Bonin, wrestler and model
 Jairus Byrd, football player
 Clara-Nova, electronic indie pop musician
 Bret Lockett, football player
 Bree Olson, pornographic actress 
 Holland Roden, actress
 Amber Stevens West, actress and model
 October 8
 Will Brooks, mixed martial artist
 Terrill Byrd, football player
 Edgar Castillo, soccer player
 Adron Chambers, baseball player
 Steven Curfman, soccer player
 October 9 – Chaz Roe, baseball player
 October 10
 Cedric Peerman, football player
 Rachel Yurkovich, Olympic javelin thrower
 October 11 – Jamar Chaney, football player
 October 12
 Jackie Bates, football player
 Trevor Bell, baseball player
 Tyler Blackburn, actor, singer and model
 Marcus T. Paulk, actor, rapper and dancer
 October 13
 John Albert, mixed martial artist
 Isabella Boylston, ballerina
 Tim Burke, golfer
 Raquel Lee, actress
 Julia McIlvaine, actress 
 October 14
 Wesley Matthews, basketball player
 Skyler Shaye, actress
 October 15
 Kentwan Balmer, football player
 Connor Barwin, football player
 Sarah Brown, middle distance runner
 Emily Cross, Olympic foil fencer
 Paul Walter Hauser, actor
 October 16
 A. J. Abrams, basketball player
 Augusto Aguilera, Ecuadorian-born actor
 Jordan Larson, volleyball player
 October 17
 David Bakes Baker, poker player
 Dan Butler, baseball player
 Michael Byrne, football player
 Josh Cameron, soccer player
 Chris Motionless, singer and frontman for Motionless in White
 October 18 – Josh Romanski, baseball player
 October 19
 London Crawford, football player
 Moses Stone, hip-hop artist, music producer, entrepreneur, and actor
 October 20 – Ryan Bedford, Olympic speed skater
 October 21
 Natalie Holloway, young female who went missing in Aruba in 2005
 Sean McInerney, surfer and stunt performer
 Riley Skinner, football player
 Tamerlan Tsarnaev, Russian-born terrorist (d. 2013)
 October 22
 Mike Blumel, speed skater
 Chancellor, South Korean-born musician
 Kyle Gallner, actor
 October 23
 Mark Cardenas, politician
 Briana Evigan, actress and dancer
 LoLa Monroe, rapper, model, and actress
 Jessica Stroup, actress
 October 24 – Brayden Coombs, football coach
 October 25
 Antwon, rapper
 Didi Benami, singer and American Idol contestant
 Tweety Carter, basketball player
 Hannah Cohen, singer and model
 Kyle Moore, football player
 Eloy Pérez, boxer (d. 2019)
 October 26
 Robert Carroll, politician
 Schoolboy Q, rapper
 October 27
 Jimmy Bartolotta, basketball player
 Boyd Brown, politician
 Chris Butler, ice hockey player
 Casanova, rapper
 Erica Dasher, actress
 Christine Evangelista, actress
 Crystal Langhorne, basketball player
 Monte Money, singer, guitarist for Escape the Fate (2004-2013), and frontman for Beyond Unbroken
 October 28
 Helena Andrews, author, journalist, and pop culture critic
 Dorrough, rapper
 Tamar Kaprelian, musician and singer
 Alex Zayne, wrestler
 October 29
 Ciron Black, football player
 Italia Ricci, Canadian-born actress
 Derek Theler, actor
 October 31
 Jim Cummings, actor and filmmaker
 Lee Fang, journalist
 Sean Paul Lockhart, porn actor and director

November

 November 1
 Yamiche Alcindor, journalist
 Penn Badgley, actor
 Michelle Sechser, Olympic rower
 November 2
 Brandon Barklage, soccer player
 Yurizan Beltran, pornographic actress, model, and mainstream actress (d. 2017)
 Hannah Hart, youtuber
 Jade Jolie, drag queen and TV personality
 November 3
 Yael Averbuch West, soccer player
 Davon Jefferson, basketball player
 Jermaine Jones, singer
 Jasmine Trias, singer
 November 4
 Amanda Blumenherst, golfer
 Kristin Cast, author
 November 6
 James Ferraro, experimental musician, producer, composer and contemporary artist
 Katie Leclerc, actress
 Miguel Mena, Peruvian-born jockey (d. 2021)
 Ben Rector, singer/songwriter and record producer
 November 7
 Caleb Bonham, businessman and TV personality
 Amanda Busick, sports reporter
 James Ferraro, musician and contemporary artist
 Andy Hull, singer and frontman for Manchester Orchestra
 Patrick Trahan, football player
 November 8
 Kevin Bivona, musician and audio engineer
 Ryan Colburn, football player
 Ilya Serov, Russian-born trumpeter and singer
 Aaron Swartz, computer programmer, internet activist, and co-founder of Reddit (d. 2013)
 November 9
 Cody Brown, football player
 Kali Fajardo-Anstine, novelist and writer
 November 10
 Chase Coffman, football player
 Aaron Crow, baseball player
 Andy Mientus, actor, singer, composer, and writer
 Josh Peck, actor, voice actor, comedian
 Eric Thames, baseball player
 November 11
 Jon Batiste, musician and TV personality
 Victor Cruz, football player
 Anthony Purpura, rugby player
 Mark Sanchez, football player
 November 12 – Sean Canfield, football player
 November 13
 Josh Bell, baseball player
 Selvish Capers, football player
 Evan Strong, Paralympic snowboard cross racer
 November 14
 Thomas Austin, football player and coach
 Michael Bihovsky, actor and composer
 Matthew Bogusz, politician
 Courtney Enders, drag racer
 Kalisto, wrestler and luchador
 Cory Michael Smith, actor
 November 15
 Winston Duke, Trinbagonian-born actor
 Coye Francies, football player
 Matthew Patrick, youtuber
 Jerry Roush, singer/songwriter and frontman for Sky Eats Airplane (2006-2009), Of Mice & Men (2010-2011), and Glass Cloud
 Devin Thomas, football player
 Jason Trost, actor and filmmaker
 November 16 – Omar Mateen, Islamic terrorist, mass murderer and perpetrator of the Orlando nightclub shooting
 November 17
 Christina Birch, cyclist
 Erik Lorig, football player
 November 18 – Joseph Ashton, actor
 November 19
 Zane Beadles, football player
 Erin Hamlin, Olympic luger
 Veronica Scott, fashion designer
 November 20
 Chris Camozzi, mixed martial artist
 Josh Carter, basketball player
 Ashley Fink, actress and singer
 Djuan Trent, YouTuber and pageant winner
 November 21
 Colleen Ballinger, Internet personality, Youtuber, and comedian
 Alex Barnett, basketball player
 Ben Bishop, hockey player
 Kyle Bosworth, football player
 November 22 – Claire Lutz, kite surfer
 November 24
 Dean Anna, baseball player
 K. C. Asiodu, football player
 Jimmy Graham, football player
 Mohamed Massaquoi, football player
 Kenny Phillips, football player
 November 25
 Randy Blake, kickboxer
 Katie Cassidy, actress
 Cole Escola, comedian, actor, and singer 
 Jason Rae, politician
 November 26
 Antonella Barba, singer
 Trevor Morgan, actor
 Lauren Nelson, beauty queen and pageant winner
 November 27
 Joe Cox, football player and coach
 Tiffany Pham, entrepreneur, model, TV personality, author, and founder and CEO of Mogul
 November 28
 Arjun Gupta, actor
 Trevor Hall, singer/songwriter and guitarist
 Max Rose, politician
 Johnny Simmons, actor
 November 29
 Nick Barese, baseball player and coach
 Jackie Barnes, goalball player
 November 30 – Jordan Farmar, basketball player

December

 December 1
 Mandela Barnes, politician, 45th Lieutenant Governor of Wisconsin
 DeSean Jackson, football player
 Andrew Tate, British-born kickboxer
 December 2
 Jason Bennett, basketball player
 Derek Cassidy, football player
 Jackie Cruz, American-born Puerto Rican soccer player
 Mardy Gilyard, football player
 Lorenzo Washington, football player (d. 2021)
 December 3
 Evan Beard, entrepreneur and co-founder of A Plus
 Brittany Cameron, soccer player
 Joshua Friedel, chess grandmaster
 James Laurinaitis, football player
 December 4
 Koby Clemens, baseball player
 Amanda Fink, tennis player
 Martell Webster, basketball player
 December 5
 Zach Avery, actor and convicted felon
 LeGarrette Blount, football player
 Justin Smoak, baseball player
 December 6
 Freddie Barnes, football player
 Matt Clapp, football player
 Matt Niskanen, hockey player
 December 7
 Chris Chalk, actor
 Nita Strauss, rock musician and guitarist
 December 8
 Enzo Amore, wrestler
 Ashley Campbell, country singer/songwriter
 Kate Voegele, musician and actress
 December 9
 Nissim Black, rapper, songwriter, and record producer
 Shane Bowen, football coach
 Amanda Cappelletti, politician
 Brianna Felnagle, middle-distance runner
 December 10
 Kahlil Bell, football player
 Matt Clark, baseball player
 Elaine Welteroth, journalist
 December 11
 Cedric Agnew, boxer
 Steven Black, football player
 Tyvon Branch, football player
 Condola Rashād, actress
 December 12
 Frank Alesci, soccer player
 Shea Buckner, Olympic water polo player
 Joey Cantens, basketball coach
 Sam Cronin, soccer player
 John Napier, Olympic bobsleigher
 Cam Thomas, football player
 December 13
 Dennis Bermudez, mixed martial artist
 Zachary Laoutides, actor, screenwriter, and filmmaker
 Sunita Mani, actress
 Jonathan B. Wright, actor
 McCall Zerboni, soccer player
 December 14
 Andrew Tate, kickboxer/internet personality
 Levi Coleman, soccer player
 Stephen Keech, singer/songwriter and frontman for Haste the Day
 December 15
 Lauren Boebert, politician
 Andre Brown, football player
 Nick Buss, baseball player
 West Cox, politician
 Ester Dean, singer 
 Jane Park, golfer
 December 16
 Bryan Anderson, baseball player
 Nicole Fawcett, volleyball player
 FDA Music, Saudi-born rapper
 Ryan Lollis, baseball player
 December 17
 Emma Bell, actress
 Austin Gibbs, singer and musician
 Vanessa Zima, actress
 December 18
 3D Na'Tee, rapper
 Ron Brace, football player (d. 2016)
 Chris Carter, baseball player
 Marcus Cousin, basketball player
 Bill Stull, football player
 December 19
 Jessica Adair, basketball player
 Adam Amin, sportscaster
 Chris Brooks, gymnast
 Ingrid Burley, rapper and songwriter
 Andrew Combs, singer/songwriter and guitarist
 Tyrell Sutton, football player
 December 20
 Kane Beatz, record producer and songwriter
 Natascha Bessez, singer, actress, and beauty pageant titleholder
 Sean Cunningham, American-born Dutch basketball player
 Anoop Desai, singer
 Tori Hall, TV personality and pageant winner
 December 22
 Krystal Joy Brown, actress
 Chris Chancellor, football player
 Jeff Choquette, stock car racing driver
 Camille Thurman, jazz musician
 Jeffery Wood, actor
 December 23
 Alex Field, football player
 Noël Wells, actress and comedian
 December 24
 Darrius Barnes, soccer player
 Chris Cockrum, stock car racer
 Ana Brenda Contreras, American-born Mexican actress and singer
 Tim Elliott, mixed martial artist
 December 25
 Tumbo Abanikanda, football player
 Josh Baker, football player
 Zak Boggs, soccer player
 Patrick Brown, football player
 December 26
 Joe Alexander, basketball player
 Josh Beech, English-born singer/songwriter
 Chykie Brown, football player
 Chris Gronkowski, football player
 December 27
 Phillip Buffington, soccer player
 Jamaal Charles, football player
 December 28
 Armon Bassett, basketball player
 Chase Beeler, football player
 Lauren Stephens, cyclist
 December 29
 Chris Creveling, Olympic speed skater
 Sullivan Fortner, jazz pianist
 Ally Maki, actress
 December 30
 Jon Cox, soccer player
 Demetrius Crawford, football player
 Sierra Fellers, skateboarder
 Caity Lotz, actress, dancer, and singer
 Jeff Ward, actor
 December 31
 Adam Chanler-Berat, actor and singer
 Nate Freiman, baseball player

Full date unknown

 Nasreldin Abdelbari, Sudanese-born author, lawyer, and human rights advocate
 Intisar Abioto, artist and storyteller
 Sharon Aguilar, Panamanian-born multi-instrumentalist and singer/songwriter
 Andrew J. Allen, saxophonist
 Jake Allston, sound designer
 Christy Altomare, actress and singer/songwriter
 Isaiah Andrews, economist and professor at Harvard University
 Krystina Arielle, actor and cosplayer
 Dana Linn Bailey, bodybuilder
 Jes Baker, writer, photographer, and activist
 Nathan Baptist, powerlifter
 Wayne Barrett, kickboxer
 Carter Beckworth, singer/songwriter
 Salehe Bembury, footwear designer
 Lily Benson, artist and filmmaker
 Dominic Berger, hurdler
 Sam Biddle, technology journalist
 Sarah Biscarra-Dilley, artist, curator, and writer
 Bjorn Bjorholm, bonsai artist
 Erin Boheme, jazz singer
 Brandon Bolmer, singer/songwriter, music producer, and visual artist
 Clarissa Bonet, artist and photographer
 Botzy, rapper
 Will Brill, actor
 Colin Brittain, songwriter and producer
 Brandon Broady, comedian, actor, and television host
 Calvin Brock, basketball player
 Natalie Brunell, Polish-born media personality, investigative journalist, podcast host, and educator
 Tania Marie Caringi, Italian-born model
 Frankie Celenza, chef
 Steph Cha, novelist and fiction writer
 Michelle Chamuel, singer/songwriter and producer
 Durga Chew-Bose, writer
 Marika Cifor, archivist
 Cobi, musician
 Tanner Cohen, actor and singer
 Petra Cortright, artist
 Pamela Council, artist and educator
 Rob Crane, Olympic sailor
 Amie Cunat, artist
 Tom Demmer, politician
 Andre Douglas, systems engineer and NASA astronaut candidate
 Angela Faustina, contemporary realism artist
 Justin Favela, mixed-media artist
 Ron Ferguson, politician
 Liana Finck, cartoonist and author
 Jordan Fliegel, entrepreneur and venture capitalist
 Edgar Flores, politician
 Gerardo Flores, convicted murderer
 Egan Frantz, Artist
 George Hansel, politician
 Cavalier Johnson, politician, mayor of Milwaukee, Wisconsin (2021-present)
 Andrea Lo, internet entrepreneur
 Pidgeon Pagonis, intersex activist
 Omar Suleiman, Muslim scholar, civil rights leader, writer, and public speaker
 Aly Tadros, singer/songwriter
 Cassie Taylor, singer/songwriter
 Jeffery Thompson, football player, comic book author, filmmaker, and entrepreneur

Deaths

January

 January 6 – Una Merkel, actress (b. 1903)
 January 14 – Donna Reed, actress (b. 1921)
 January 16 – Herbert W. Armstrong, founder of the Worldwide Church of God (b. 1892)
 January 23 – Willard Van Dyke, filmmaker and photographer (b. 1906)
 January 24 – L. Ron Hubbard, science fiction author, founder of Scientology (b. 1911)
 January 28 – crew of the Space Shuttle Challenger on mission STS-51-L:
 Gregory Jarvis, astronaut and engineer (b. 1944)
 Christa McAuliffe, school teacher (b. 1948)
 Ronald E. McNair, astronaut and physicist (b. 1950)
 Ellison Onizuka, astronaut (b. 1946)
 Judith Resnik, astronaut and engineer (b. 1949)
 Francis R. Scobee, astronaut (b. 1939)
 Michael J. Smith, astronaut (b. 1945)
 January 29 – Leif Erickson, actor (b. 1911)

February
 February 1 – Ida Rhodes, mathematician, pioneer in computer programming (b. 1900)
 February 2 – Gino Hernandez, wrestler (b. 1957)
 February 11 – Frank Herbert, writer (b. 1920)
 February 16 – Howard Da Silva, actor (b. 1909)
 February 17 – Paul Stewart, actor (b. 1908)
 February 19 – Barry Seal, smuggler of drugs and arms, aircraft pilot, and money launderer and former Trans Worlds Airlines pilot (b. 1939)

March

 March 2 – William D. Mullins, politician and baseball player (b. 1931)
 March 4 – Howard Greenfield, songwriter (b. 1936)
 March 6
 Adolph Caesar, actor (b. 1933)
 Georgia O'Keeffe, artist (b. 1887)
 March 10 – Ray Milland, Welsh-born actor and director (b. 1907)
 March 18 – Bernard Malamud, novelist and short story writer (b. 1914)
 March 19 – Jon Lormer, actor (b. 1906)
 March 22 – Charles Starrett, actor (b. 1903)
 March 28 – Virginia Gilmore, actress and wife of Yul Brynner (b. 1919)
 March 29 – Harry Ritz, American actor (b. 1907)
 March 30 – James Cagney, actor (b. 1899)
 March 31 – Jerry Paris, American actor and director (b. 1925)

April

 April 15 – Tim McIntire, actor (b. 1944)
 April 17 – Paul Costello, Olympic rower – double sculls (b. 1894)
 April 19 – Alvin Childress, actor (b. 1907)
 April 23
 Harold Arlen, music composer (b. 1905)
 Otto Preminger, Austrian-born film director (b. 1905)
 April 26
 Broderick Crawford, actor (b. 1911)
 Bessie Love, actress (b. 1898)
 April 27 – J. Allen Hynek, ufologist (b. 1910)

May

 May 3 – Robert Alda, actor (b. 1914)
 May 9 – Herschel Bernardi, actor (b. 1923)
 May 15 – Theodore White, writer (b. 1915)
 May 20 – Helen B. Taussig, cardiologist (b. 1898)
 May 23 – Sterling Hayden, actor (b. 1916)
 May 24 – Yakima Canutt, actor and stuntman (b. 1895)
 May 25 – Chester Bowles, politician (b. 1901)
 May 26 – Gian-Carlo Coppola, film producer (b. 1963)
 May 28 – Lurene Tuttle, actress (b. 1907)
 May 30 – Perry Ellis, fashion designer (b. 1940)
 May 31 – James Rainwater, physicist, Nobel Prize laureate (b. 1917)

June

 June 5 – Bryan Grant, tennis champion (b. 1909)
 June 11 – Chesley Bonestell, painter (b. 1888)
 June 13 – Benny Goodman, jazz musician (b. 1909)
 June 14 – Alan Jay Lerner, lyricist (b. 1918)
 June 17 – Kate Smith, singer (b. 1907)
 June 19 – Len Bias, basketball player (b. 1963)
 June 27 – Don Rogers, football player (b. 1962)
 June 28 – Mary Anderson, actress (b. 1897)

July

 July 3 – Rudy Vallée, radio show host, bandleader, singer, actor (b. 1901)
 July 8 – Hyman G. Rickover, admiral (b. 1900)
 July 14 – Raymond Loewy, French-born industrial designer (b. 1893)
 July 18 – Buddy Baer, boxer and actor (b. 1915)
 July 22 – Floyd Gottfredson, cartoonist (b. 1905)
 July 24 – Fritz Albert Lipmann, German-born biochemist, recipient of the Nobel Prize in Physiology or Medicine (b. 1899)
 July 25
 Ted Lyons, baseball player (Chicago White Sox) and member of the MLB Hall of Fame (b. 1900)
 Vincente Minnelli, film director (b. 1903)
 July 26 – W. Averell Harriman, American diplomat and politician (b. 1891)
 July 31 – Teddy Wilson, jazz pianist (b. 1912)

August
 August 2 – Roy Cohn, American lawyer (b. 1927)
 August 11 – Chuck McKinley, American tennis champion (b. 1941)
 August 21 – Thad Jones, American jazz musician (b. 1923)
 August 26 – Ted Knight, American actor (b. 1923)

September
 September 1 – Murray Hamilton, actor (b. 1923)
 September 4 – Hank Greenberg, baseball player and member of the MLB Hall of Fame (b. 1911)
 September 6 – Blanche Sweet, actress (b. 1896)
 September 11 – Henry DeWolf Smyth, physicist (b. 1898)
 September 27 – Cliff Burton, former Metallica bassist (b. 1962)

October
 October 5 – Hal B. Wallis, film producer (b. 1898)
 October 14 – Keenan Wynn, actor (b. 1916)
 October 23 – Edward Adelbert Doisy, biochemist, recipient of the Nobel Prize in Physiology or Medicine (b. 1893)
 October 25 – Forrest Tucker, actor (b. 1919)
 October 26 – Jackson Scholz, Olympic athlete (b. 1897)
 October 31 – Robert S. Mulliken, physicist and chemist, recipient of the Nobel Prize in Chemistry (b. 1896)

November

 November 2 – Paul Frees, actor, comedian (b. 1920)
 November 11 – Roger C. Carmel, actor (b. 1932)
 November 18 – Gia Carangi, supermodel (b. 1960)
 November 21
 Jerry Colonna, comedian (b. 1904)
 Dar Robinson, stunt performer and actor (b. 1947)
 November 22 – Scatman Crothers, actor and musician (b. 1910)
 November 29 – Cary Grant, British-born actor (b. 1904)

December

 December 2 – Desi Arnaz, Cuban-born actor, bandleader, musician and television producer; co-founder of Desilu Productions (b. 1917)
 December 10 – Susan Cabot, actress (b. 1927)
 December 13
 Heather Angel, British-born actress (b. 1909)
 Ella Baker, civil rights activist (b. 1903)
 December 24 – Gardner Fox, writer (b. 1911)
 December 26 – Elsa Lanchester, British-born actress (b. 1902)
 December 31 – Lloyd Haynes, actor (b. 1934)

See also
 1986 in American television
 List of American films of 1986
 Timeline of United States history (1970–1989)

References

External links
 

 
1980s in the United States
United States
United States
Years of the 20th century in the United States